São Gabriel do Oeste is a municipality located in the Brazilian state of Mato Grosso do Sul. Its population was 27,221 (2020) and its area is 3,865 km2.

References

External links

Municipalities in Mato Grosso do Sul